Aeroporti di Roma S.p.A. (abbreviated ADR) is an Italian fixed-base operator of Leonardo da Vinci-Fiumicino Airport (in Greater Rome) and Rome Ciampino Airport since 1997 (the year of privatization). The headquarter of the company is located in Leonardo da Vinci-Fiumicino Airport.

The company was a minority shareholders of Aeroporto di Genova (15%), as well as Airports Company South Africa from 1998 to 2005.

References

External links 
 

Italian companies established in 1997
Airport operators of Italy
Airports in Rome
Transport in Lazio
Companies based in Lazio
Companies based in Rome
Fiumicino
Metropolitan City of Rome Capital
Transport companies established in 1997
Region-owned companies of Italy
Privatized companies of Italy
Companies formerly listed on the Borsa Italiana